The Fleming Museum may refer to:
 Robert Hull Fleming Museum at the University of Vermont
Alexander Fleming Museum at St Mary's Hospital in London